Kossi Prince Segbefia (born 11 March 1991) is a Togolese professional footballer who plays as a midfielder for Turkish club Tuzlaspor. He is a Togolese international, having made his debut in September 2011 against Botswana. His older brother, Alikem, is also a footballer who plays for Al-Jaish SC Damascus in Syria.

Club career

Early career 
Born in Lomé, Segbefia began his football career at the Centre de Développement Sportif de Lomé, also known as Sporting Club de Lomé. He spent nearly a decade at the club before venturing to France where he underwent trials with professional clubs Marseille, Reims, Niort, and Sochaux. Several of the clubs were interested in signing Segbefia to a youth contract, but due to his age, 16 years old at the time, he was not signed. Afterwards, Segbefia returned to Togo where he was spotted by German Winfried Schäfer who was serving as manager of Al Ain in the United Arab Emirates. Segbefia, subsequently, signed with the club. Due to Al Ain being allowed to use only four foreigners in its squad, he spent most of his time with Al Ain playing on the reserve team.

Auxerre 
In 2009, Segbefia returned to his home country and met with former Sporting Club de Lomé player Emmanuel Adebayor. Adebayor recommended that he play in France and contacted Francis de Taddeo who had coached him at Metz and was now serving as the youth academy director of Auxerre. After successfully trialing with the club, Segbefia was signed to a one-year amateur contract. He spent the 2009–10 season playing on Auxerre's under-19 team before earning promotion to the club's reserve team in the Championnat de France amateur, the fourth level of French football, for the 2010–11 season. Segbefia spent the majority of the season with the team making 17 appearances and scoring one goal. In April 2011, he was called up to the senior team by manager Jean Fernandez and made his club debut in a 1–0 league victory over Toulouse appearing as a substitute. A week later, he made his first club start in a 1–1 draw with Lens. Segbefia finished the campaign with four appearances and, on 6 May 2011, signed a three-year professional contract with the club.

International career

Youth 
Segbefia made his youth international debut at under-17 level playing with the Togo under-17 team. He made his debut in a 2006 friendly match against the Burkina Faso. The Togo under-17 team later qualified for both the 2007 African Under-17 Championship and the 2007 FIFA U-17 World Cup. In the former competition, he appeared in all five matches the team contested as it finished runner-up to Nigeria. In the U-17 World Cup, he appeared in two group stage matches; as a starter in a 1–1 draw with Costa Rica and as a substitute in a 2–1 defeat against South Korea. Togo finished its group in last place.

Senior 
On 28 August 2011, Segbefia was called up to the senior national team for the first time for a 2012 Africa Cup of Nations qualifying match against Botswana on 4 September. He made his senior international debut in the match, which Togo won 1–0.

Career statistics

Club

International 

Scores and results list Togo's goal tally first, score column indicates score after each Segbefia goal.

References

External links 
 Club Profile
 
 
 
 

1991 births
Living people
Sportspeople from Lomé
Togolese footballers
Association football midfielders
Togo international footballers
2013 Africa Cup of Nations players
2017 Africa Cup of Nations players
Ligue 1 players
Ukrainian Premier League players
TFF First League players
AJ Auxerre players
FC Zorya Luhansk players
Elazığspor footballers
Göztepe S.K. footballers
Gaziantep F.K. footballers
Altay S.K. footballers
Tuzlaspor players
Togolese expatriate footballers
Togolese expatriate sportspeople in France
Togolese expatriate sportspeople in Ukraine
Togolese expatriate sportspeople in Turkey
Expatriate footballers in France
Expatriate footballers in Ukraine
Expatriate footballers in Turkey
21st-century Togolese people